Schläppi is a Swiss surname. Notable people with the surname include:

 Alfred Schläppi (1898–1981), Swiss bobsledder
 Heinrich Schläppi (1905–1958), Swiss bobsledder

Swiss-German surnames